Heraultia is a genus of tachinid flies in the family Tachinidae.

External links

Tachinidae